, born , was a Japanese kabuki actor, regarded as the leading tachiyaku (specialist in male roles) of the postwar decades; he also performed in a number of non-kabuki venues, including Western theatre and films. Taking the name Hakuō upon retirement, he was known as Matsumoto Kōshirō VIII for much of his career.

Names
Like most kabuki actors, Hakuō had a number of stage names (gō) over the course of his career. A member of the Koraiya guild, he would often be called by that name, particularly in the practice of kakegoe, in which an actor's guild name, yagō, or other phrases (e.g., jūnidaime, meaning "the twelfth") is shouted out as a cheer or encouragement during a performance. Originally appearing on stage as Matsumoto Sumizō II, he later took the names Ichikawa Somegorō V and Matsumoto Kōshirō VIII.

Lineage
The son of Matsumoto Kōshirō VII and son-in-law of Nakamura Kichiemon I, the man who would later be called Hakuō was born into the kabuki world, and grew up in it. His brothers, Ichikawa Danjūrō XI and Onoe Shōroku II, were actors, as are his sons, Nakamura Kichiemon II and Matsumoto Kōshirō IX, and his grandson Ichikawa Somegorō VII.

Life and career
After making his first stage appearance in 1925, at the age of fifteen, under the name Matsumoto Sumizō II, he took the name Ichikawa Somegorō V in 1931. In 1949, when Somegorō was 39, his father, Kōshirō VII, died, and the actor took his father's name at a shūmei (naming ceremony) a few months later, becoming the eighth Matsumoto Kōshirō. The ceremony was held at the Kabuki-za in Tokyo, and featured the play Kanjinchō, in which Kōshirō VIII played Benkei and Higuchi Jirō Kanemitsu.

His film credits include Emperor Hirohito in Japan's Longest Day (日本のいちばん長い日, Nihon no ichiban nagai hi), in which Toshirō Mifune played General Korechika Anami, Ii Naosuke in Samurai Assassin (侍, Samurai), and a number of other jidaigeki (samurai period films).

Kôshirō was named a Living National Treasure in 1975, a rare and very illustrious honor awarded in Japan to those who embody, promote, and preserve traditional culture. He retired six years later, in 1981, taking on the name Hakuō in retirement and passing on the name Kōshirō to his son.

Hakuō died the following year, on 11 January 1982.

Honours
Medal with Purple Ribbon (1972)
Living National Treasure (1975)
Person of Cultural Merit (1978)
Order of Culture (1981)

Partial filmography
Films
Teki wa Hon'nō-ji ni Ari (1960) - Akechi Mitsuhide
Yato kaze no naka o hashiru (1961) - Tasaka, shôgen
Chūshingura: Hana no Maki, Yuki no Maki (1962) - Ōishi Kuranosuke
Samurai Assassin (1965) - Lord Naosuke Ii
Japan's Longest Day (1967) - Emperor Hirohito 
Admiral Yamamoto (1968) - Mitsumasa Yonai
Chōkōsō no Akebono (1969) - Hideo Edo
Battle of the Japan Sea (1969) - Emperor Meiji
Bandits vs. Samurai Squadron (1978) - Kuranosuke Tsuji
Television
 Onihei Hankachō (1969-72) - Hasegawa "Onihei" Heizō
 Daichūshingura (1971)
 Ōgon no Hibi (1978)

Notes

References
Matsumoto Hakuō at Kabuki21.com
Frederic, Louis (2002). Japan Encyclopedia. Cambridge, Massachusetts: Harvard University Press.

See also
 Matsumoto Kōshirō - line of kabuki actors

External links

Kabuki actors
Persons of Cultural Merit
Recipients of the Order of Culture
Living National Treasures of Japan
People from Tokyo
Male actors from Tokyo
1910 births
Matsumoto Hakuo